Scott Driscoll (born May 2, 1968) is a Canadian retired National Hockey League linesman, who wore uniform number 68.

Career 
Driscoll's career began in the 1992–93 NHL season. He worked more than 1,840 regular season games, 185 playoff games, three Stanley Cup Finals (2004, 2007, and 2014), and the 1996 World Cup of Hockey. Driscoll retired in 2020.

References

1968 births
Living people
National Hockey League officials

People from Huron County, Ontario
Ice hockey people from Ontario